Ancherythroculter kurematsui is a species of cyprinid in the genus Ancherythroculter. It is native to the Yangtze in China, and was described in 1934.

Named in honor of U. Kurematsu, Japanese General Council of Chengtu (now Chingdu), capital of Sichuan Province, China, where it occurs.

References

Cyprinidae
Freshwater fish of China